Saklı can refer to:

 Saklı, Güroymak
 Saklı, Hasankeyf